Henny Koch (22 September 1854 – 13 June 1925) was a translator and a German children's author. She was born in Alsfeld, Grand Duchy of Hesse. From 1898 on, she lived in Jugenheim an der Bergstraße in Hessia, Germany, where she died in 1925. She produced the first German translation of Mark Twain's The Adventures of Huckleberry Finn in 1890. Henny Koch wrote 29 books, mainly for young girls. Her books were published in eight countries. Her most successful work was a series of novels, beginning with Papas Junge, in which you can accompany the protagonist through her life as a young girl, a mother and grandmother. A film has been made based on this novel Il birichino di papà, Italy, 1943, directed by Raffaello Matarazzo with music by Nino Rota.

Works

Children's Books

1901 Mein Sonnenstrahl
1902 Das Mägdlein aus der Fremde
1904 Rose Maries Weg zum Glück
1905 Papas Junge
1905 Die Traut
1906 Mütterchen Sylvia
1907 Allerlei Lustiges für unsere Buben und Mädels
1907 Irrwisch
1908 Aus großer Zeit
1908 Die ins Leben lachen
1909 Friedel Polten und ihre Rangen
1910 Kleine Geschichten für kleine Leute
1911 Evchen der Eigensinn
1911 Das Komteßchen
1912 Im Lande der Blumen
1914 Ein tapferes Mädchen
1916 Die Vollrads in Südwest
1916 Die Patentochter des alten Fritz
1916 Wildes Lorle
1917 Die verborgene Handschrift
1917 Aus sonnigen Tagen
1919 Klein Großchen
1921 Glory
1922 Von der Lach-Els und anderen
1922 Jungfer Ursel
1924 Das Heiterlein
1925 Hochgeborene
1930 Wir fünf

External links

Official website (in German)

1854 births
1925 deaths
People from Alsfeld
People from the Grand Duchy of Hesse
19th-century German women writers
20th-century German women writers
German children's writers
German translators
German women children's writers